List of hospitals in the Maldives include the following:
 ADK Hospital
 Faafu Atoll Hospital
 Gan Regional Hospital
 Indira Gandhi Memorial Hospital

References

Hospitals in the Maldives
Hospitals
Maldives
Maldives